Qeshlaq-e Mohammad Qoli may refer to:

 Qeshlaq-e Mohammad Qoli, Ardabil, a village in Ardabil Province, Iran
 Qeshlaq-e Mohammad Qoli, West Azerbaijan, a village in West Azerbaijan Province, Iran